Anarsia bimaculata is a moth in the family Gelechiidae. It was described by Ponomarenko in 1989. It is found in Japan, Korea, the Russian Far East (Primorye) and China (Jilin).

The length of the forewings is 6.5–7.2 mm for males and 6.6–7.4 mm for females. The forewings are whitish grey, irregularly suffused with pale fuscous and scattered with blackish scales. The hindwings are brownish grey.

The larvae feed on Maackia amurensis.

References

bimaculata
Moths described in 1989
Moths of Asia